Cuthona nana is a species of sea slug, an aeolid nudibranch, a marine gastropod mollusc in the family Tergipedidae.

Taxonomic history
This species was named in 1842. In 1848 the same authors described Eolis peachii from Fowey harbour, Cornwall. The two species were considered to be the same by Brown, 1980.

Distribution
Cuthona nana was described from specimens found under stones near low water mark at Cullercoats and Whitley Bay on the North Sea coast of England. It is reported from the NE Atlantic from Greenland and Spitsbergen south to Brittany, France.

Ecology
Feeds on the hydroid Hydractinia echinata.

References 

Tergipedidae
Gastropods described in 1842